Joyce DeWitt (born April 23, 1949) is an American actress and comedian known for playing Janet Wood on the ABC sitcom Three's Company from 1977 to 1984.

Early life
Joyce DeWitt was born April 23, 1949, in Wheeling, West Virginia, and grew up in Speedway, Indiana, a suburb of Indianapolis. She graduated from Speedway Senior High School, and once worked at the Indianapolis Motor Speedway ticket office. She is of Italian descent. She competed in speech and debate through the Indiana High School Forensic Association. After she received a bachelor's degree in theater from Ball State University, she moved to California to earn her master's degree from UCLA, graduating in 1974.

Career

DeWitt began appearing on stage at the age of 13. She earned a Bachelor of Arts degree from Ball State University. Subsequently, while she was performing in summer stock, the director convinced her to enroll in UCLA's Department of Theater MFA program, where she was awarded the Master of Fine Arts Fellowship as well as the Clifton Webb Scholarship. While attending UCLA, she worked as a secretary until her television debut on an episode of Baretta. Contrary to rumors that she was mentored by actor Abe Vigoda, Dewitt has said that the two never met.

DeWitt is best known for her role as Janet Wood during the 1977–1984 run of the sitcom Three's Company, a job she obtained after being cast in the show's second pilot. She also played Janet in a 1979 episode of the spinoff series The Ropers.

After Three's Company ended in 1984, DeWitt appeared in an episode of Finder of Lost Loves in 1984, after which she quit acting for several years. She resumed acting with a part in a production of Noises Off at Michigan's Cherry County Playhouse in June 1991. She later appeared in the 1995 TV comedy film Spring Fling! A character based on her, voiced by another actress, appeared in a 1997 episode of Pinky and the Brain. She made an appearance in an episode of Cybill, and had a cameo on the penultimate episode of Living Single. Her 2000s works includes TV shows such as Hope Island, The Nick at Nite Holiday Special and Call of the Wild.

DeWitt co-produced and hosted the 2003 NBC-TV television film Behind the Camera: The Unauthorized Story of Three's Company. In the film, DeWitt is portrayed by Melanie Paxson. 

In 2008, she appeared in the indie film Failing Better Now. In 2009, DeWitt starred in a stage production of Married Alive in Calgary, Canada.

In June 2011, DeWitt succeeded Eve Plumb in the title role of the play Miss Abigail's Guide to Dating, Mating & Marriage at the Downstairs Cabaret Theatre in New York City's Times Square. That same year, she appeared in a Canadian stage production of Dinner with Friends at Theatre Aquarius in Hamilton, Canada.

In 2012, DeWitt appeared in two separate stage productions of Love Letters starring opposite Tab Hunter and Tony Dow, respectively.

In 2012, DeWitt appeared on Suzanne Somers' talk show, Suzanne Somers: Breaking Through, during which she and Somers reminisced about their time on Three's Company together. Somers apologized for the conflict that arose between them, and they exchanged anecdotes about the last time they each spoke to their late co-star John Ritter. DeWitt's appearance on Somers' program marked the first time the two actresses had seen or spoken to each other since having a major falling out 31 years earlier, involving a salary dispute.

In 2018, DeWitt played Mother Superior in a stage production of Nunsense at the Hunterdon Hills Playhouse in New Jersey.

Charity work
DeWitt participated with members of the House and Senate at the Capitol Hill Forum on Hunger and Homelessness, and has hosted presentations for the Family Assistance Program of Hollywood. She hosted the International Awards Ceremony at the White House for the Presidential End Hunger Awards, and co-hosted, with Jeff Bridges, the World Food Day Gala at the Kennedy Center.

Personal life
DeWitt was in a romantic relationship with actor and director Ray Buktenica from 1973 to 1980.

Arrest
On July 4, 2009, DeWitt was arrested in El Segundo, California, and cited for drunken driving. According to press reports, police pulled her over after she drove past a barricade near a park. An officer arrested the actress after he observed signs she had been drinking and administered a field sobriety test. She was booked at the police station, cited, and released on her own recognizance. On May 27, 2010, she pleaded no contest to one count misdemeanor and was placed on three years' probation and ordered to undergo a nine-month alcohol program. She was also ordered to pay a $510 fine, plus penalty assessments. In exchange for her plea, a second misdemeanor count was dismissed.

Filmography

References

External links

 
 
 

1949 births
American film actresses
American television actresses
American people of Italian descent
American people of Dutch descent
Ball State University alumni
Living people
Actresses from Indianapolis
Actors from Wheeling, West Virginia
Actresses from West Virginia
20th-century American actresses
UCLA Film School alumni
21st-century American actresses
American child actresses
People from Marion County, Indiana
American stage actresses
University of California alumni